The Rose Ensemble is an early-music group based in St. Paul, Minnesota, and founded in 1996 by Artistic Director Jordan Sramek.

The Rose Ensemble has appeared on American Public Media and the European Broadcasting Union (most notably with annual holiday broadcasts) and has performed extensively throughout the Americas and Europe.

Past Touring Programs 
 Il Poverello: The Life and Legacy of St. Francis of Assisi
 Christmas in Baroque Malta: Italian Majesty at Mdina Cathedral
 Land of Three Faiths: Voices of Ancient Mediterranean Jews, Christians, and Muslims
 The Last Queen of Hawai'i: Music from the Soul of the Hawaiian Saga
 American Roots: Harmonies that Shaped a Nation
 A Renaissance Requiem: Tomas-Luis de Victoria's Mass for the Departed
 Slavic Wonders: Feasts and Saints in Early Russia, Bohemia, Poland and Ukraine

Collaborations 
With Voces8:
 Renaissance Music for Two Choirs (2009)
 Voices of Venice & Rome: The Glory of Italian Renaissance Choral Music (2010)
 The Miraculous Mass of Mary: North American Premiere of a Renaissance Masterpiece (2012)
With Piffaro, The Renaissance Band: 
 Spain in the New World: Song and Dance in Early Mexico, Guatemala, Bolivia, and Peru (2012)
 Welcome the People: The Musical Legacy of the Reformation (2017)
With the Minnesota Orchestra:
 Navidad en Cuba: Christmas in Havana Cathedral (2014) 
With the Dark Horse Consort:
 The Requiem of Pedro de Escobar: As it might have been performed at Seville Cathedral, for the funeral of Prince Juan (1478–1497) (2015)
 Empire, Religion, War, Peace: Music from Europe's 30-Year Conflict, 1618–1648 (2018)

Commissions 
From its founding, The Rose Ensemble performed numerous works commissioned for or by them. These have included works by Carol E. Barnett, Eric Barnum, William Beckstrand, Abbie Betinis, Edie Hill, Linda Kachelmeier, Michael Karmon, Sergey Kvoshchinsky, J. David Moore, Stephen Paulus, John Rommereim, Timothy Takach, and Victor Zupanc.

Educational Programs and Outreach 
The Rose Ensemble provided educational programming for students in elementary, middle school, high school, and university settings, as well as outreach programs in public libraries, senior homes, and various community organizations.

For high school and college students, Sramek and ensemble members provided a wide range of clinics, masterclasses, lectures, and interactive discussions, as well as opportunities for integrated rehearsals and performances with Ensemble musicians.

Public library programs highlighted the research of concert programs, demonstrations of historical instruments, and cultural context within musical traditions.

The Senior Community Outreach program featured a variety of early-American music, and as designed to maximize comfort of and participation by seniors of all abilities.

Awards and Achievements 
 Recipient of a Rockefeller Arts & Religion in the Twin Cities Award
 2005 Chorus America's Margaret Hillis Award for Choral Excellence 
 First-place winner in the sacred music category at the 2007 Tolosa International Choral Competition (Spain)
 First-place winner in BOTH the sacred and secular music categories at the 2012 Tolosa International Choral Competition 
2018 Early Music America's Laurette Goldberg Award for Lifetime Achievement in Early Music Outreach

Recordings 
Seasons of Angels: Harmony of the Spheres
Slavic Holiday: Legends from Ancient Czechoslovakia and Poland
The Road to Compostela
Fire of the Soul: Choral Virtuosity in 17th-Century Russia and Poland
Celebremos El Nino: Christmas Delights from the Mexican Baroque
Rosa Das Rosas: Cantigas de Santa Maria & Other Spiritual Songs for the Virgin
Nā Mele Hawaiʻi: A Rediscovery of Hawaiian Vocal Music. Features heavily in the HBO limited series, The White Lotus
And Glory Shone Around: Early American Carols, Country Dances, Southern Harmony Hymns, and Shaker Spiritual Songs
Il Poverello: Medieval & Renaissance Music for Saint Francis of Assisi
A Toast to Prohibition: All-American Songs of Temperance and Temptation
Treasures from Baroque Malta

References

External links
 The Rose Ensemble

Choirs in Minnesota
Early music choirs
Arts organizations based in Saint Paul, Minnesota
Culture of Saint Paul, Minnesota
Musical groups established in 1996
Musical groups from the Twin Cities
1996 establishments in Minnesota